Leeper may refer to:

 Leeper, Missouri, United States
 Leeper, Pennsylvania, United States
 Leeper, fictional creatures in the Sierra video games
 Lunar Leepers
 Learning with Leeper

People 
Alexander Leeper (1848–1934), Australian educationalist
Arthur A. Leeper (1855–1931), American politician and lawyer
Blake Leeper (born 1989), Paralympic athlete
Bob Leeper (born 1958), politician and chiropractor
Curtis Leeper (born 1955), soccer player
Dave Leeper (born 1959), baseball player
David R. Leeper (1832–1900), American politician and writer
Doris Marie Leeper (1929–2000), aka "Doc", sculptor and painter
Evelyn C. Leeper (born 1950), writer and critic
James Leeper Johnson (1818–1877), politician
Nathan Leeper (born 1977), high jumper
Reginald Leeper (1888–1968), British civil servant and diplomat
Robert D. Leeper (1891–1932), Justice of the Idaho Supreme Court
Valentine Leeper (1900–2001), Australian writer

See also
Leaper (disambiguation)
Leiper (a surname)